Choristoneura luticostana is a species of moth of the family Tortricidae. It is found in China (Heilongjiang, Jilin), the Korean Peninsula, the Russian Far East and Japan. The habitat consists of fir-broad-leaved and cedar-broad-leaved forests.

Adults have been recorded on wing from June to August.

The larvae feed on Quercus, Betula, Lespedeza and Rhododendron species, as well as Malus pumila. They cut open the buds and roll the leaves at the apices of the branches. Young larvae are green with a black head. Older larvae are blackish-green, also with a black head. Larvae can be found from May to June.

References

Moths described in 1888
Choristoneura